Eucalyptus suberea, commonly known as Mount Lesueur mallee or cork mallee, is a species of mallee or a small tree that is endemic to a small area on the west coast of Western Australia. It has rough bark on some or all of the trunk, smooth white bark above, lance-shaped adult leaves, flower buds in groups of eleven to twenty or more, white flowers and shortened spherical fruit.

Description
It has rough, corky or flaky grey to brownish bark on some or all of the trunk, smooth white, sometimes powdery bark above. Flowering has been recorded in September and the flowers are white.

Taxonomy and naming
Eucalyptus suberea was first formally described in 1986 by Ian Brooker and Stephen Hopper in the journal Nuytsia from specimens Brooker collected, north of Badgingarra in 1983. The specific epithet (suberea) is from the Latin word subereus and refers to the rough, corky bark of older specimens.

Distribution and habitat
Mount Lesueur mallee grows on scree slopes in open mallee over dense heath, from near Mount Lesueur towards Badgingarra.

Conservation status
This eucalypt is classified as "vulnerable" under the Australian Government Environment Protection and Biodiversity Conservation Act 1999 and as "Threatened Flora (Declared Rare Flora — Extant)" by the Department of Environment and Conservation (Western Australia). The main threat to the species is inappropriate fire regimes.

See also
List of Eucalyptus species

References

Eucalypts of Western Australia
Trees of Australia
suberea
Myrtales of Australia
Plants described in 1986
Taxa named by Ian Brooker
Taxa named by Stephen Hopper